Rajavaram is a village in Atreyapuram Mandal, Dr. B.R. Ambedkar Konaseema district in the state of Andhra Pradesh in India.

Geography 

Demographics 
 India census, Rajavaram had a population of 2803, out of which 1397 were male and 1406 were female. The population of children below 6 years of age was 10%. The literacy rate of the village was 66%.

References 

Villages in Atreyapuram mandal